Sheila Margaret Greaves  (1 January 1911 – 30 March 2005) was a British army nurse and recipient of the George Medal during the Second World War.

Sheila Greaves was born in Leicester, England on New Year's Day 1911; the second daughter of the Reverend Arthur Greaves and Blanche Greaves. Between 1932 and 1936 she was a probationary nurse at Guy's Hospital, London qualifying as a state registered nurse (SRN) in June 1936.

Greaves enlisted in the Queen Alexandra’s Imperial Military Nursing Service (QAIMNS) and was made a provisional staff nurse in January 1938.  Promotion to sister came in 1943.

Having served in France in 1939–1940, Greaves served in Syria and the Middle East between 1941 and 1943 before the Sicilian and Italian campaigns in 1943. In 1944 Greaves was a nursing sister at 15 Casualty Clearing Station (CCS) in the Anzio bridgehead in Italy. The two casualty clearing stations (2nd and 15th) and other medical facilities was within range of enemy artillery and air attacks. Sister Greaves immediately ran to the reception camp to treat the wounded while the air attacks continued. Her actions were noticed by senior officers and a recommendation for the award of the George Medal was made. The recommendation noted that:
The recommendation was approved and the award of the George Medal was published in the London Gazette on 23 March 1945.

After the war Greaves continued to serve in the QAIRNS until he resigned in 1948 shortly after her marriage to Major Humphrey Fox of the Royal Artillery.

References

1911 births
2005 deaths
Queen Alexandra's Royal Army Nursing Corps officers
Recipients of the George Medal
People from Leicester